Mohamed Aissaoui is a paralympic athlete from Algeria competing mainly in category T46 Middle-distance events.

Athletics

Paralympics 
Aissaoui competed in the 800m, 1500m and 5000m in both the 2000 and 2004 Summer Paralympics and won the bronze medal in the T46 1500m in Athens in 2004.  He also competed in the 1500m in the 2008 Summer Paralympics in Beijing but only managed to finish seventh.

References

Paralympic athletes of Algeria
Athletes (track and field) at the 2000 Summer Paralympics
Athletes (track and field) at the 2004 Summer Paralympics
Athletes (track and field) at the 2008 Summer Paralympics
Paralympic bronze medalists for Algeria
Living people
Medalists at the 2004 Summer Paralympics
Year of birth missing (living people)
Paralympic medalists in athletics (track and field)
21st-century Algerian people
Algerian male middle-distance runners
20th-century Algerian people
Middle-distance runners with limb difference
Paralympic middle-distance runners